The Anne Gould Hauberg Artist Images Award (prior to 2007 simply the Artist Images Award) is a biennial (was annual until 2009) award given by the University of Washington Libraries in partnership with the UW Alumni Association. A public lecture is given by the artist and a bookmark is designed in honor of the recipient.

Past winners of the award are:

American awards
Visual arts awards